Le Tiercent is a commune in the Ille-et-Vilaine department in Brittany in northwestern France.

Geography

The neighboring communes are Chauvigné, Saint-Marc-le-Blanc, Baillé, Saint-Hilaire-des-Landes, Saint-Ouen-des-Alleux, and Saint-Christophe-de-Valains.

Population
Inhabitants of Le Tiercent are called Tiercentois in French.

See also
Communes of the Ille-et-Vilaine department

References

External links

 Geography of Brittany
 The page of the commune on infobretagne.com

Communes of Ille-et-Vilaine